3 EPs is a full-length CD by New Zealand band Tall Dwarfs released in 1994. The CD consists of three parts, A Question Of Medical Ethics, Up The Down Staircase and Sam's Spaniel, which were also released as three vinyl EPs collected in one box, all at once.

Track listing
All songs written by Bathgate & Knox except where noted.

A Question of Medical Ethics
"For All the Walters in the World"
"Entropy"
"What Goes Up"
"Highrise"
"Starry Eyed & Wooly Brained" (sic)
"Folding"

Up The Down Staircase
"Neusyland"
"Two Dozen Lousy Hours"
"Bob's Yer Uncle"
"More 54"
"Archaeopteryx"
"Aint It Funny"

Sam's Spaniel
"Senile Dementia" (written by Bathgate, Knox, Nastanovich, Kannberg)
"Bee to Honey"
"Postmodern Deconstructivist Blues" (written by Bathgate, Knox, Nastanovich, Kannberg)
"Kidstuff"
"Self-Deluded Dream Boy (In A Mess)"
"Our Advice to You"

References

Tall Dwarfs albums
1994 albums
Flying Nun Records EPs
Flying Nun Records albums
1994 EPs